Eucalyptus socialis subsp. viridans, commonly known as the green-leaved red mallee, is a subspecies of mallee that is endemic to south-eastern Australia. It usually has rough bark on the base of the trunk, smooth bark above, lance-shaped adult leaves, flower buds in groups of between seven and eleven, pale creamy yellow flowers and barrel-shaped  to urn-shaped or spherical fruit.

Description
It usually has rough, loose, fibrous or flaky bark at the base of the trunk, smooth tan to grey bark above.

Taxonomy and naming
Eucalyptus socialis subsp. viridans was first formally described in 2005, by Dean Nicolle in Australian Systematic Botany from specimens collected near Minlaton in 1977. The epithet viridans is from the Latin viridis meaning "green", referring to the colour of the leaves of this subspecies.

Distribution and habitat
The green-leaved red mallee grows in mallee in soils overlying limestone, often with other eucalypts, including E. calcareana, E. gracilis and E. phenax. It is found on the Eyre and Yorke Peninsulas, Kangaroo Island and as far east as Ngarkat in South Australia. There are also a few records in the far west of Victoria.

References 

viridans
Myrtales of Australia
Flora of South Australia
Flora of Victoria (Australia)
Plants described in 2005